Vechin (also Romanized as Vechīn; also known as Viachin and Vyachin) is a village in Sanjabad-e Shomali Rural District, in the Central District of Kowsar County, Ardabil Province, Iran. At the 2006 census, its population was 101, in 26 families.

References 

Tageo

Towns and villages in Kowsar County